Stanislav Rybalchenko (Станіслав Рибалченко, born ) is a Ukrainian male weightlifter, competing in the 94 kg category and representing Ukraine at international competitions. He participated at the 1996 Summer Olympics in the 99 kg event. He competed at world championships, most recently at the 1998 World Weightlifting Championships.

Major results
 - 1994 World Championships Sub-Heavyweight class (395.0 kg)
 - 1997 European Championships Sub-Heavyweight class (390.0 kg)

References

External links
 

1971 births
Living people
Ukrainian male weightlifters
Weightlifters at the 1996 Summer Olympics
Olympic weightlifters of Ukraine
Place of birth missing (living people)
World Weightlifting Championships medalists
20th-century Ukrainian people
21st-century Ukrainian people